There have been several referendums in 2014

 2014 Bulgarian electoral code referendum
 2014 Danish Unified Patent Court membership referendum
 2014 Egyptian constitutional referendum
 2014 Kraków referendum
 2014 Liechtenstein pensions referendum
 2014 Lithuanian land sales referendum
 2014 Northern Cyprus constitutional referendum
 2014 Sammarinese referendum
 2014 Slovenian archives law referendum
 2014 Swiss referendums
 2014 Yemeni constitutional referendum
 2014 independence referendum
 2014 Catalan independence referendum
 2014 Crimean status referendum
 2014 Donbass status referendums
 2014 Iraqi Kurdistan independence referendum
 2014 Scottish independence referendum
 2014 Venetian independence referendum

See also
 2014 independence referendum (disambiguation)